Ron Crawford (born October 11, 1945 in Tampa, Florida) is an American actor and artist.

Filmography

Film

Television

Video games

External links

Official art site

1945 births
Living people
American male film actors
Male actors from Tampa, Florida